I magliari (internationally released as The Magliari) is a 1959 Italian drama film directed by Francesco Rosi. The film won the silver ribbon for best cinematography.

In 2008 it was selected to enter the list of the 100 Italian films to be saved.

Plot summary 
 
Totonno is the leader of a gang of Italian workers who for years have been in West Germany. The group picks up rags and second hand cloths, marketing them to customers for sheer fabric with which to sew clothes. The work is dishonest.

Mario is a fellow Italian in Germany to work as a miner but decides to return to Italy after losing his job. Totonno steals his passport to avoid the police and then offers Mario a job as “magliaro” (cloth seller). Mario decides to stay.

Totonno and his gang are exposed and decide to relocate to Hamburg. They encounters a band of Pole, who're doing the same dirty work. Mario begins an affair with Paula, the wife of a wealthy man.

Cast 
Alberto Sordi: Ferdinando Magliulo, detto Totonno
Belinda Lee: Paula Mayer
Renato Salvatori: Mario Balducci
Nino Vingelli: Vincenzo
Aldo Giuffrè: Armando
Aldo Bufi Landi: Rodolfo Valentino
Josef Dahmen: Mr. Mayer

Production
Filming took place in Hamburg, Germany in April–May 1959. 

It was one of a series of sexually aggressive roles Lee played in Europe.

Awards
It won best black and white photography at the Italian Film Critics Award.

Reception
Senses of Cinema wrote "Unfairly neglected by critics and historians, the film is usually regarded a prelude to the Neapolitan director's ambitious, labyrinthine chronicles of power and corruption of the 1960s and 70s."

References

External links

Magliari at Letterbox

1959 films
Films directed by Francesco Rosi
Italian drama films
Films set in Hamburg
Films set in West Germany
Social realism in film
Films about immigration to Germany
1950s Italian films